The men's rings competition at the 1948 Summer Olympics was held at Earls Court Exhibition Centre on 12 and 13 August. It was the seventh appearance of the event. There were 121 competitors from 16 nations, with each nation sending a team of up to 8 gymnasts. The event was won by Karl Frei of Switzerland, with his countryman Michael Reusch earning silver; they were the nation's first medals in the event. Zdeněk Růžička of Czechoslovakia took bronze.

Background

This was the seventh appearance of the event, which is one of the five apparatus events held every time there were apparatus events at the Summer Olympics (no apparatus events were held in 1900, 1908, 1912, or 1920). Two of the top 10 gymnasts from 1936 returned: sixth-place finisher Michael Reusch of Switzerland and eighth-place finisher (and 1932 competitor) Heikki Savolainen of Finland. No world championship had been held since World War II; Alois Hudec, who did not compete in 1948, was still the reigning world (1938) and Olympic (1936) champion. Reusch had finished second at the 1938 world championship.

Argentina, Cuba, Denmark, and Egypt each made their debut in the men's rings. The United States made its sixth appearance, most of any nation, having missed only the inaugural 1896 Games.

Competition format

The gymnastics format continued to use the aggregation format. Each nation entered a team of up to eight gymnasts (Cuba and Argentina had only 7; Mexico only 5, with one not starting in the rings; and Austria had one gymnast of its 8 not start in the rings). All entrants in the gymnastics competitions performed both a compulsory exercise and a voluntary exercise for each apparatus, with the scores summed to give a final total. The scores in each of the six apparatus competitions were added together to give individual all-around scores; the top six individual scores on each team were summed to give a team all-around score. No separate finals were contested.

For each exercise, four judges gave scores from 0 to 10 in one-tenth point increments. The top and bottom scores were discarded and the remaining two scores summed to give the exercise total. If the two scores were sufficiently far apart, the judges would "confer" and decide on a score. Thus, exercise scores ranged from 0 to 20, apparatus scores from 0 to 40, individual totals from 0 to 240, and team scores from 0 to 1,440.

Schedule

All times are British Summer Time (UTC+1)

Results

References

Men's rings
1948
Men's 1948
Men's events at the 1948 Summer Olympics